Jamika Wilson is an American make-up artist. She won an Academy Award in the category Best Makeup and Hairstyling for the film Ma Rainey's Black Bottom.

Selected filmography

References

External links 

Living people
Year of birth missing (living people)
Place of birth missing (living people)
American make-up artists
Best Makeup Academy Award winners
21st-century African-American women